Arachnis is a genus of moths in the subfamily Arctiinae, subfamily Arctiinae. The genus was erected by Carl Geyer in 1837.

Species
 Arachnis aulaea Geyer, 1837
 Arachnis citra Neumögen & Dyar, 1893 (syn: Arachnis apachea Clarke, 1941)
 Arachnis dilecta (Boisduval, 1870)
 Arachnis martina H. Druce, 1897
 Arachnis midas Barnes & Lindsey, 1921
 Arachnis mishma H. Druce, 1897
 Arachnis nedyma Franclemont, 1966
 Arachnis picta Packard, 1864
 Arachnis tristis Rothschild, 1935
 Arachnis zuni Neumoegen, 1890

References

Spilosomina
Moth genera